Ashurabad (also Romanized as ‘Āshūrābād; also known as ‘Āshūrābād-e Bālā) is a village in Deylaman Rural District, Deylaman District, Siahkal County, Gilan Province, Iran. At the 2006 census, its population was 83, in 29 families.

References 

Populated places in Siahkal County